Glów  is a village in the administrative district of Gmina Radłów. It is within Tarnów County, Lesser Poland Voivodeship in southern Poland.

References

Villages in Tarnów County